Aldo Fiorelli (1915–1983) was an Italian actor who appeared in around thirty films between 1938 and 1960. One of his final roles was Argos, the Shipbuilder in the 1958 film Hercules and its 1959 sequel Hercules Unchained.

Filmography

References

External links

Bibliography
 Hughes, Howard. Cinema Italiano: The Complete Guide from Classics to Cult. I.B.Tauris, 2011.

1915 births
1983 deaths
Italian male film actors
People from the Province of Florence
20th-century Italian male actors